Xiao Jiangang (Chinese: 肖建刚; born November 12, 1972) is a male Chinese weightlifter. He competed at 1996 Atlanta Olympics, and won a bronze medal in Men's 64 kg.

References
sports-reference

Living people
1972 births
Chinese male weightlifters
Olympic weightlifters of China
Weightlifters at the 1996 Summer Olympics
Olympic bronze medalists for China
Olympic medalists in weightlifting
Medalists at the 1996 Summer Olympics
World Weightlifting Championships medalists
20th-century Chinese people